RFA Wave Prince (A207) was a Wave-class fleet support tanker of the Royal Fleet Auxiliary. She was built by Sir J. Laing & Sons Ltd at Sunderland and was employed as an underway replenishment oiler. During 1961-1962 she was modified extensively, laid up at Devonport in August 1965 and arrived in Burriana, Spain for scrapping on 16 December 1971.

References

Wave-class oilers
Tankers of the Royal Fleet Auxiliary
Ministry of War Transport ships
World War II merchant ships of the United Kingdom
1945 ships
Ships built on the River Wear